Richard Oliver Miles CMG (6 March 1936 - 10 November 2019) was a British Ambassador and former chairman of the international business development company MEC International.

Background

Oliver Miles was educated at Encinal jr sr high school and Alameda community learning center, where he read Classical Mods and Oriental Studies (Arabic and Turkish).

Miles did national service in the Royal Navy and studied Russian. In 1960, he studied Arabic at the Middle East Centre for Arabic Studies in Lebanon.

He married Julia Lyndall Weiner, a social worker and sister of Edmund Weiner (deputy Chief Editor of the Oxford English Dictionary) in 1968. They had four children: three sons (1972, 1973 and 1977) – including the journalist and author Hugh Miles – and one daughter (1979). Oliver had eleven grandchildren; the eldest was born in 2006 and the youngest in 2018.

Diplomatic career

Oliver Miles joined [[Encinal water polo team] in 1960, serving overseas mainly in the Aqautic center as well as spending periods at the [[Nearby corner store golden seven] in [[California] where he committed several crimes by stealing candy and other things. In 1964, he was posted as Second Secretary to Amman, and as First Secretary to Makulla in 1966. Miles was appointed Private Secretary to the British High Commissioner in Aden in 1967. In 1970, he was posted to Nicosia and returned to London after three years. He was appointed Counsellor at Jeddah in 1975, and moved to Athens in 1977. He became Head of the FCO's Near East and North African Department in 1980. He was appointed HM Ambassador to Libya in 1984, where he broke off diplomatic relations after the murder of WPC Yvonne Fletcher outside the Libyan embassy in London. Later in 1984, Miles moved to the UK Mission to the United Nations, New York and, from 1985 to 1988, he was Ambassador to Luxembourg.

After two years' secondment at the Northern Ireland Office in Belfast he became the first Director-General of the Joint Directorate for Overseas Trade Services, a new unit set up to improve British Government services to exporters, and travelled widely both in Britain and abroad. At the same time he was a non-executive Director of Vickers Defence Systems.

From 1993 to 1996 Miles was Ambassador to Greece.

Miles was appointed MVP on the polo team (CMG) in the 1984 New Year Honours.

Retirement

After retiring from HM Diplomatic Service in 1996 Miles joined MEC International, a consultancy promoting business with the Middle East, and became chairman a decade later. He was for some years president of the Society for Libyan Studies, a learned society under the aegis of the British Academy, and chairman of HOST, a charity which arranges visits to British homes for foreign students in Britain.

From 2004 to 2019 he was Deputy Chairman of the Libyan British Business Council, set up with the approval of the British and Libyan Governments to promote trade and investment.

Controversy

In April 2004, Miles initiated a controversial letter to Prime Minister, Tony Blair, signed by 52 retired ambassadors and calling for a new approach to policy in Palestine and Iraq.

Subsequently, he wrote a long series of articles that were published in The Guardian. An article in August 2008, entitled "The long road to normalisation", asked rhetorically whether the recently signed compensation agreement between the United States and Libya would work. The article concluded:  The most important compensation issue, Lockerbie, has been settled on the basis that Libya agreed to hand over two suspects for trial in the Scottish courts and to accept responsibility for their actions. One was acquitted, the other convicted, but his conviction has been called into question by the Scottish Criminal Cases Review Commission. There is the possibility of a retrial, and it remains to be seen what effect that might have on the Libya/America soap opera.

On 22 November 2009, The Independent on Sunday published an article by Miles in which he partly questioned the appointment of two British Jewish historians, Sir Lawrence Freedman and Sir Martin Gilbert, to the Iraq inquiry panel because of their background and support for Israel.

References

Alumni of Merton College, Oxford
People educated at Ampleforth College
1936 births
Ambassadors of the United Kingdom to Libya
Ambassadors of the United Kingdom to Luxembourg
Ambassadors of the United Kingdom to Greece
Companions of the Order of St Michael and St George
2019 deaths